Hydroplaning and hydroplane may refer to:

 Aquaplaning or hydroplaning, a loss of steering or braking due to water on the road
 Hydroplane (boat), a fast motor boat used in racing
 Hydroplane racing, a sport involving racing hydroplanes on lakes and rivers
 Floatplane, a type of seaplane, with one or more slender pontoons
 Flying boat, a fixed-winged seaplane with a hull, allowing it to land on water
 Gallaudet Hydroplane, an early aircraft employing the use of wing-warping for roll control
 Hydrofoil, a boat with wing-like foils mounted on struts below the hull
 Planing (boat), a method by which the hull of a boat skims over the surface of the water
 Seaplane, a powered fixed-wing aircraft capable of taking off and landing on water
 Diving plane, a submarine control surface used to help control depth
 Hydroblading, a figure skating move sometimes referred to as hydroplaning

See also 
 Terraplane (disambiguation)